Ghomijeh (also Romanized as Ghomījeh) is a village in Neysan Rural District, Neysan District, Hoveyzeh County, Khuzestan Province, Iran. At the 2006 census, its population was 60, in 9 families.

References 

Populated places in Hoveyzeh County